Elodie Lawton Mijatović (also spelled Mijatovics and Mijatovich; 1825 – 13 December 1908) was a British author who lived in Boston in the 1850s, where she was an advocate of the abolitionist movement.

Biography
In 1864 she married Serbian politician, writer and diplomat Čedomilj Mijatović (1842–1932) and lived with him in Belgrade and then in London, where she died. 

She translated several works from English into Serbian and published several books on Serbia in English, including The History of Modern Serbia (London: William Tweedie, 1872) and Serbian Folk-lore (London: W. Isbister & Co, 1874). She translated Serbian national songs of the Kosovo cycle into English and tried to organise them into one national ballad: Kossovo: an Attempt to bring Serbian National Songs, about the Fall of the Serbian Empire at the Battle of Kosovo, into one Poem (London: W. Isbister, 1881).

References 
Simha Kabiljo-Šutić, Posrednici dveju kultura. Studije o srpsko-engleskim književnim i kulturnim vezama [Mediators between two Cultures. Studies on Serbian-English Literary and Cultural Relations (Belgrade: Institut za književnost i jezik, 1989)], pp. 9–48. 
Slobodan G. Marković, Grof Čedomilj Mijatović. Viktorijanac među Srbima (Count Čedomilj Mijatović. A Victorian among Serbs), Belgrade, Dosije and the University of Belgrade Faculty of Law Press, 2006, pp. 66–71.
Slavonic Review, Nos. 15-16 (March and June 1927). Dragutin Subotić, Yugoslav Popular Ballads. Their origin and development (Cambridge: At the University Press, 1932).

External links
 
 
 

English–Serbian translators
British non-fiction writers
1825 births
1908 deaths
19th-century translators
Serbian–English translators